Scotland’s Garden and Landscape Heritage (abbreviated SGLH) is a charitable organisation founded on 11 May 2015, after a merger between the Garden History Society in Scotland (GHSS) and the Garden History Society in Scotland Conservation Trust (GHSSCT).

The SGLH organises historic garden and designed-landscape surveys by volunteers. It works with a conservation consultant in responding to planning applications, and its advice is sought by planning authorities nationwide.

The organisation receive funding from entities such as Historic Environment Scotland (HES), the Heritage Lottery Fund (HLF), Scottish Forestry and local authorities. We also welcome support from individuals and charitable trusts.

References

External links

Charities based in Edinburgh
2015 establishments in Scotland
Organizations established in 2015